The 1st Cambodian Parachute Battalion (Fr: 1er bataillon de parachutistes khmers) was a French paratroop battalion in French Indochina made up of Cambodian recruits during the colonial First Indochina War.

It was formed on December 1, 1952.

See also

References

Cambodian
Cambodian
Cambodian Parachute Battalion
Military units and formations of the First Indochina War
Cambodian Parachute Regiment
Cambodian Parachute Battalion